Jamal R. Nassar is Dean of the College of Social and Behavioral Sciences at California State University, San Bernardino. He was born in Jerusalem, received  a B.A. from Jacksonville University in 1972, a M.A. from the University of South Florida in 1974 and a Ph.D. from the University of Cincinnati in 1978. Immediately afterwards, he joined the faculty at Illinois State University, where he served as chair of the Department of Politics and Government until accepting the post at CSUSB in 2007. His specialty is Middle Eastern politics.

Publications
Globalization and Terrorism: The Migration of Dreams and Nightmares
Intifada: Palestine at the Crossroads
The Palestine Liberation Organization: From Armed Struggle to the Declaration of Independence
Change Without Borders: The Third World at the End of the Twentieth Century
Politics and Culture in the Developing World: The Impact of Globalization. 

Many of his articles, chapters and reviews have also been translated into about a dozen other languages. 
Dr. Nassar has chaired several national and international conferences on the Middle East, has addressed the United Nations on the Palestine question, and has been a consultant or expert witness in court cases in the United States and Canada.

He was the editor of Arab Studies Quarterly from 1991–95. He remains on the editorial board of this and other scholarly journals.

References

External links
Jamal R. Nassar homepage

Year of birth missing (living people)
Living people
Jacksonville University alumni
University of South Florida alumni
University of Cincinnati alumni
Illinois State University faculty
California State University, San Bernardino faculty
Middle Eastern studies in the United States
Palestinian academics
People from Jerusalem
Palestinian emigrants to the United States